Tracy Berno is a New Zealand academic, specialising in cross-cultural psychology and food. As of 2022 she is a full professor of the culinary arts in the School of Hospitality and Tourism at Auckland University of Technology.

Academic career 

Berno has a BA with honours in psychology from Vassar College, and an MA in psychology from the University of Canterbury. She completed a PhD in psychology in 1995 and also has a postgraduate tertiary teaching certificate from the University of the South Pacific. Berno worked as Planning Director and a lecturer in tourism at Lincoln University, and in 1996 was awarded an Excellence in Teaching award. The citation noted Berno's skill in making the learning process of quantitative social science research methods enjoyable. Berno moved to Auckland University of Technology, rising to full professor in January 2022. She is also an adjunct professor at the University of the South Pacific. Her research centres on sustainable food systems, and a "food-lab approach" to socially and economically sustainable development. Berno founded Pacific Food Lab-Aotearoa (PFL-A), which is a partner organisation to Pacific Food Lab-New Caledonia.

Berno has co-authored three award-winning books on "agriculture, culture, cuisine and tourism development in the South Pacific and Asia". Me'a Kai: The Food and Flavours of the South Pacific ,which Berno co-authored with Robert Oliver and Shiri Ram, was awarded the Best New Zealand Cookbook and the Cookbook of the Year award in the Gourmand World Cookbook Awards in 2010. Berno contributed to Hiakai: Modern Māori Cuisine with chef Monique Fiso, with research on the origins of Māori cuisine. Hiakai won the best illustrated non-fiction award at the 2021 Ockham New Zealand Book Awards. Mea´Ai Samoa. Recipes and Stories from the heart of Polynesia was another collaboration with chef Robert Oliver and photographer Shiri Ram, it won the "Best authors and chefs award" in the Gourmand World Cookbook Awards of 2014.

Selected works 
Cookbooks
 
 
 
Academic publications

References 

New Zealand academics
New Zealand women academics
New Zealand food writers
Academic staff of the Lincoln University (New Zealand)
University of Canterbury alumni
Academic staff of the University of the South Pacific
Academic staff of the Auckland University of Technology
Vassar College alumni
Year of birth missing (living people)
Living people